The Old Bar Fortress may refer to:
 A somewhat intact fortification in Stari Bar, Montenegro
 Ruins of a fortress in Bar, Ukraine